Yizzy (born Yisrael Parkins, 30 December 1999) is an English grime MC. In 2017, Yizzy released his debut EP This Is Life. His follow-up EP, S.O.S., was released in May 2018. He then released his third EP, Welcome To Grime Street, in 2019 and his fourth EP, 'Prince of Grime' in 2020.

Personal life
Yizzy was born in Wales to a father from Jamaica and a Welsh mother. He is also a supporter of Arsenal F.C.

Career 
Yizzy (originally Young Yizzy) released 'Insanity EP' in 2016, with production credits featuring JME, Swifta Beater and K1. Yizzy's 2016 song 'Grime Kid' earned him runner up in Glastonbury Festival's 2017 Emerging Talent Competition, leading him to perform on a main stage. In September 2017, he became the first recipient of the Future Fund, a grant set up by BBC Music Introducing and PRS Foundation for up-and-coming artists. Yizzy has since played at Field Day 2019.

Discography

Extended plays

Singles

References

1999 births
Grime music artists
People from Lewisham
Living people